The Exmouth Open originally called the Exmouth Lawn Tennis Club Tournament or simply Exmouth Tournament was a men's and women's grass court tennis tournament founded in 1880. From 1890 the event was known as the Exmouth Open Tennis Tournament. It was hosted by the Exmouth Archery, Croquet and Lawn Tennis Club, Exmouth, Devon, Great Britain until 1927. It was then hosted by the newly founded Exmouth Lawn Tennis Club until it was abolished as a senior tour event in 1975.

History
The Exmouth Archery, Croquet and Lawn Tennis Club was founded in 1879. In 1880 the club hosted the first Exmouth Lawn Tennis Club Tournament for men only. In 1881 the tournament became an open event for both men and women as well. The first winner of the open men's singles was England's Ernest Maconchy (later Brigadier General), and  first winner of the women's open singles was Ireland's Lilian Cole. The event was one of the earliest English tournaments that featured a women's singles event.

In 1880s following the Wimbledon Championships it was part of what was known as the "Western tour" over the course of five weeks taking in the grass court events such as the Teignmouth and Shaldon Tournament at Teignmouth, the Torquay Lawn Tennis Tournament at Torquay, the Bournemouth Open Tournament at Bournemouth, and finishing off at the South of England Championships at Eastbourne.

In August 1888 a Battle of the Sexes charity tennis match was staged at the tournament, predating the modern famous match by 85 years, between Ernest Renshaw and Lottie Dod, Renshaw won but only just! From 1890 the event was known as the Exmouth Open Tennis Tournament. In 1968 following the start of the open era it was renamed to the Exmouth Open. The event was part of the Amateur Tour (1877–1912), the ILTF Amateur Tour (1913–1967) and the ITF Independent Tour (1968–1975). In 1970 the tournament was called the Robertson Viota Exmouth Open for sponsorship reasons. In 1971 it was known as the Bio-Strath Exmouth Open until 1975.

Former notable of winners the men's singles event include; Charles Lacy Sweet, Charles Walder Grinstead, Harry Grove, Ernest Wool Lewis, William Renshaw, Reggie Doherty, Ryuki Miki, Jaroslav Drobny. Former winners of the women's singles title included; Maud Watson, Blanche Bingley Hillyard, Phyllis Satterthwaite and Sue Barker. The final men's edition held in 1975 was won by Britain's Jonathan Smith, and the final winner of the women's singles was Czech player Jana Simonova.

Finals

Men's singles
Incomplete roll

Men's doubles
Incomplete roll

Women's singles
Incomplete roll

Mixed doubles
Incomplete roll

References

Sources
 Club History. Exmouth, Devon, England: Phear Park Bowling Club. 
 Dwight, James (1886).Lawn Tennis. Boston, Massachusetts, United States: Wright & Ditson. 
 Fletcher, Kelly (23 September 2020). "Book Review: Tennis for the people". New Frame.
 Heathcote, John Moyer (1891). Tennis. London: Longmans, Green.
 Lake, Robert J. (3 October 2014). A Social History of Tennis in Britain. Oxford: Routledge. ISBN 978-1-134-44557-8.
 National Army Museum, Brigadier General Ernest Maconchy: Soldiers' Stories". ww1.nam.ac.uk. 
 Nieuwland, Alex. "Tournament – Exmouth". www.tennisarchives.com. Netherlands: Tennis Archives.
 Routledge's sporting annual (1883). London: George Routledge & Sons.
 The Boy's Own Annual. London: Leisure Hour Office. 1880.

Grass court tennis tournaments
Defunct tennis tournaments in the United Kingdom
Tennis tournaments in England